Patriotic Union is a name held by political parties in some countries:

Patriotic Union (Chile) (Unión Patriótica)
Patriotic Union (Colombia) (Unión Patriótica)
Patriotic Union (Kurdistan) (یەکێتیی نیشتمانیی کوردستان)
Patriotic Union (Liechtenstein) (Vaterländische Union)
Patriotic Union (Lithuania) (Tėvynės sąjunga)
Patriotic Union (Panama) (Unión Patriótica)
Patriotic Union (Spain) (Unión Patriótica)

Other organizations with the phrase "Patriotic Union" in their name include:
 Free Patriotic Union (الاتحاد الوطني الحرّ), Tunisia
 Patriotic Union for Democracy and Progress, Congo
 Patriotic Union, German far-right group